The 2000–01 Irish Cup was the 121st edition of Northern Ireland's premier football knock-out cup competition. It concluded on 5 May 2001 with the final.

Glentoran were the defending champions, winning their 18th Irish Cup last season after a 1–0 win over Portadown in the 2000 final. They successfully defended the trophy by beating arch rivals Linfield 1–0 after extra time. This was their 19th cup win, and their fourth in six years.  The 2001 Final was the first time the Final was shown live on Television in Northern Ireland.

Results

First round
Abbey Villa, Annagh United, Harland & Wolff Sports and Malachians all received byes into the second round.

Replay

Second round

Replays

Third round

Replays

Fourth round
Ards Rangers, Ballymoney United, Banbridge Town, Comber Recreation, Drumaness Mills, Malachians and Rathfriland Rangers all received byes into the fifth round.

Replays

Fifth round

Replays

Sixth round

Replays

Seventh round

Replays

Quarter-finals

Semi-finals

Final

References

2000–01
2000–01 domestic association football cups
Cup